A hole punch, also known as hole puncher,  or paper puncher, is an office tool that is used to create holes in sheets of paper, often for the purpose of collecting the sheets in a binder or folder.  A hole punch can also refer to similar tools for other materials, such as leather, cloth, or plastic or metal sheets.

Mechanism 

The essential parts of a hole punch are the handle, the punch head, and the die.  The punch head is typically a cylinder, with a flat end called the face.  The die is a flat plate, with a hole matching the head.  The head can move, while the die is fixed in place.  Both head and die are usually made of a hard metal, with precise tolerances.  One or more sheets of paper are inserted between the head and the die, with the flat face of the head parallel to the surface of the sheets.  Moving the handle pushes the head straight through the sheets of paper.  The hard edge of the punch vs the die cuts a hole in the paper, pushing the cut piece out the bottom of the die.  The cut-out bit of paper scrap is called a chad.

The handle functions as a lever, decreasing the amount of force the operator needs to apply. The travel distance of the cylinder is generally very short -- the thickness of the paper sheets -- so the cylinder can be positioned close to the lever fulcrum. Hole punches for larger volumes of paper (hundreds of sheets) feature longer lever arms, but function similarly.

There are hole punches which punch patterns of multiple holes at once, typically for binding multiple sheets together (see ).  Such punches generally feature two paper guides for alignment.  One guide will be along the side of the paper to be punched, and sets the distance of the holes from the edge of the paper (the margin or gutter).  The other guide will be on a perpendicular side, and aligns the holes between the top and bottom of the sheet.  One or both guides may be adjustable.

On multiple-hole punches, the positions of individual punch heads may also be adjustable.  Commonly, one or more punch heads are mounted in independent fittings, which can slide along a rail.  A set screw holds each fitting in position.  There may be marks on the device to identify standard hole positions.  There may be positions where a punch head will not make contact with the activating handle, allowing holes to be "turned off".

Some punch designs use hollow punch heads (a thin-walled tube), with the edge a sharpened blade.  This allows the chads to be pushed up and out the top, as the paper is being cut, making it more suitable for thicker volumes of paper.  For very large amounts of paper, a paper drill may be used instead of a punch.

Applications

Single-hole punches 

A single-hole punch makes a single hole per activation, usually at an arbitrary position (i.e., without alignment guides).

Single-hole punches are often used to punch an admission ticket or other document to indicate it has been used or processed.  A specialized ticket punch may be used for this purpose.  Some ticket punches have a longer reach/depth (allowing for a particular spot on the ticket to be punched), or punch a particular shape instead of a round hole.

Single-hole punches are often used to punch holes through old playing cards at casinos, marking them as "used" or "canceled". This helps cut down on cheating by eliminating any cards that may have been tainted by players.

Single-hole punches are widely used in the British Civil Service where papers are punched with a single hole in the upper left, and secured using a treasury tag.

Single-hole punches can also be used for binding, with a single loose binding ring, although this is much less common than with ring binders.

Single-hole punches can also be used to make confetti for scrapbooks and other crafting.

Eyelet punch 

A related office tool is the eyelet punch.  This is a single-hole punch which also crimps a metal fastening loop around the hole, similar to a rivet.  It is used to permanently secure a few sheets of paper together.

A similar tool, generally known as a holing pincer, is used in animal husbandry.  A common application is to attach an ear tag to a livestock animal.

Paper tape repair punch 
Specialized hand-operated tape punches were used to perform small edits and repairs on punched paper tapes used for data entry into teletypes or early computers. Torn or damaged tapes were sometimes aligned with specialized jigs, spliced with special adhesive tape, and the holes encoding data were manually restored using such punches. The ASCII character code included a special DELETE or DEL character defined as all holes punched out (code 7F), allowing an erroneous character to be canceled by punching extra holes.

As punched tape technology became obsolescent in the 1980s, the manual tape repair tools became rare.

Multiple-hole punches 
Multiple-hole punches typically place a pattern of holes along one edge of sheets of paper, allowing the pages to be bound together.

The most common use for multi-hole punched paper is with a ring binder.  A book-like cover is fitted with retaining rings matching the pattern of the punched holes.  The rings may be split open, paper sheets threaded onto them, and then the rings closed again.

A variety of hole patterns are in use for ring bindings.  In much of the world, two-hole and four-hole punches consistent with ISO 838 are the norm.  In the US, the three-hole punch is most common.  See .

There are other binding techniques which use hole punching. Coil binding uses a spring-like coil, threaded into the punched holes. Comb binding uses a plastic strip with "fingers" that clip into the punched holes.  Both use their own types of specialized hole punches.  Comb binding typically punches 19 or 23 rectangular holes (for letter and A4 paper sizes, respectively).

History 
The origins of the hole punch date back to Germany via Matthias Theel, where two early patents for a device designed to "punch holes in paper" have since been discovered. Friedrich Soennecken filed his patent on 14 November 1886, for his Papierlocher für Sammelmappen, a multiple-hole punch and office supply product. A Google Doodle was used on 14 November 2017 to celebrate the 131st anniversary of the hole punch.

The first record for a single-hole puncher—a ticket punch—was published in 1885, when Benjamin Smith helped create a spring-loaded hole puncher that had a receptacle to collect the chads. Smith dubbed it the “conductor’s punch”. A later paper punch was refined in 1893 by Charles Brooks, and it was referred to as a ticket punch due to its early role in punching train tickets as trains became increasingly popular and common between 1850 and 1900.

Concerns have risen about the lifespan of the hole punch as most paper documents are now online, making the use of it irrelevant.

Standards 
Multiple standards exist for the number and position of holes on multi-punched sheets.

International

ISO 838 

Any paper format that is at least 100 mm high can be filed using this system (e.g., ISO A7 and larger). A printed document with a margin of 20–25 mm will accommodate ISO 838 filing holes.

4-hole or 888 
A four-hole extension to ISO 838 is also in common use.  Two holes are punched in accordance with the standard, plus two additional holes located 80 mm to the outside of the standard holes.  The two additional holes provide more stability in 4-ring binders, while still allowing 4-hole paper to fit 2-ring binders.  This extension is sometimes referred to as the "888" system, because of the three 8-cm gaps between the holes. Some 2-hole punches have an "888" marking on their paper guide, to assist punching all four holes into A4 paper.

Konica-Minolta specifies that the holes should be  from the edge of the paper for European 4-hole arrangements, contrary to ISO 838.

ANSI paper sizes 
The United States and a few other countries use non-ISO paper standards, defined in ANSI/ASME Y14.1 and other intra-nation standards.  Unlike ISO 838, there appears to be no well-established official specification for ANSI paper hole patterns, and instead they are de facto standards, established by custom and tradition.

The diameter of the holes varies between manufacturers, with typical values being .  The  value is most commonly used, as it allows for looser tolerances in both ring binder and paper punching.  The distance to the paper edge also varies, with  hole-center-to-edge being typical.  Konica-Minolta specifies  for both two and three-hole variants in North America.

US letter 3-hole system 
For the US letter paper size, a three-hole standard is widely used.

US legal 4-hole system 
For US legal paper size, a 
4-hole system exists. It is still in use today, but is not as common as the 3-hole standard. The four binding positions provide more support for the longer 14-inch side of legal paper.

2-hole filebinder 

Another standard also occasionally used in the US is a "filebinder" system.

Japan 

Swedish triohålning 

In Sweden, a four-hole national standard is almost exclusively used. The guides help keep the paper in a straight line.

The official name of this four-hole system is triohålning, since it was adapted to the "Trio binder" which was awarded Swedish patent in 1890. The binder's inventor, Andreas Tengwall, supposedly named it after a consortium consisting of himself and two companions, i.e. a trio.  The binder can be opened at any place while holding the papers in place, as the inner holes have guide pins from one side, the outer holes have pins from the other side.

Others 
 The Filofax system uses six holes in two groups of three

Hole spacing chart

Gallery

See also 
 Ticket punch
 Needle punch
 Chad (paper)
 Paper drilling
 Ring binder
 Loose leaf
 Punched card
 Punched tape
 Punching

References

External links 
 

Office equipment
Hole making
German inventions
19th-century inventions
ISO standards